Rinorea uxpanapana is a species of plant in the family Violaceae. It is endemic to Mexico.

References

Endemic flora of Mexico
uxpanapana
Vulnerable plants
Taxonomy articles created by Polbot